KBIZ (1240 AM) is a radio station licensed to serve the community of Ottumwa, Iowa.  The station primarily broadcasts a news/talk format.  KBIZ is owned by Greg List, through licensee O-Town Communications, Inc.

The application for a U.S. Federal Communications Commission (FCC) construction permit for KBIZ was for 1210 kHz. Before the license was issued in May, 1941 all stations on 1210 kHz had moved to 1240 kHz due to the NARBA agreement.

KBIZ was granted a translator licence by the FCC for an FM simulcast of the AM signal. The FM signal (originally K267BC, now K274CV) began broadcasting in September 2016 at 102.7 FM.

KBIZ carries a mix of local and national programming including the following:

External links
Ottumwa Radio - O-Town Communications, Inc.

FCC History Cards for KBIZ

BIZ
Talk radio stations in the United States
Radio stations established in 1983